Cyn.in is an open-source enterprise collaborative software built on top of Plone a content management system written in the Python programming language which is a layer above Zope. Cyn.in is developed by Cynapse a company founded by Apurva Roy Choudhury and Dhiraj Gupta which is based in India. Cyn.in enables its users to store, retrieve and organize files and rich content in a collaborative, multiuser environment.

Cyn.in comes in three flavors. Cyn.in Community Edition is released under the GNU General Public License version 3 based on open standards and is completely "free" to use. Cyn.in Enterprise Editions are commercially supported, certified and tested by Cynapse. The on-premises appliance is designed towards businesses who want to install the software on their infrastructure behind their firewall. With the On-Demand Service, Cynapse hosts the software for businesses to use, in secure cloud servers.

History

Cyn.in was developed and released in late 2006 as a closed source Enterprise Bliki software, based on the .NET Framework as a SaaS offering by Cynapse. In 2008, June, Cynapse, the company behind Cyn.in, released a new version of Cyn.in and open sourced the project. This release was built on the popular open source Plone - Zope - Python framework. With this release Cynapse's intention was to expand its focus into the enterprise collaboration domain. While the new release still supported Blogs and Wikis, Cyn.in had evolved to include enterprise collaboration tools including file repositories, event calendars, image galleries and more. The company decided to discontinue using the Bliki terminology and Cyn.in is called a Collaboration software

Concepts

Application convergence
The cyn.in collaborative information management system attempts to bring together the core concepts of:
Personal information management
Organization-wide knowledge and document management
Information and file collaboration
Knowledge transfer
Content publishing

Spaces
Information can be made available in four different location namespaces, called Personal Space, Shared Space, Intranet Space and Web Space within the cyn.in application. Each Space has distinct authorization and functionality rules, for example, the Intranet Space of a cyn.in site may only be accessed by members of it, in contrast to the Web Space, where public Internet access is allowed.

Notes
Information and files in cyn.in are stored together in a common container format called a Note. A user can create any number of Notes in the system, however a Note can only reside in one Space at a time.

Taxonomy and categorization
Notes can have one or more SlashTags. SlashTags is the name given to the hierarchical tagging system used in cyn.in to categorize Notes and is used for creation of navigation trees and dynamic pop-out menus. SlashTags offer taxonomical advantages when compared to traditional folder based systems because they enable:
direct navigational access to each Note
multiple presences of the same Note in the navigation system

Key Features
Due to the emergent nature of the open source and hosted service model, the exact feature specification of the cyn.in service is updated regularly. The following core features are currently visible:

Wiki support
Blog support
Calendaring
Microblogging
Bookmark Directories
Discussion Boards
Audio and Video Galleries
File Repositories
Image Galleries and slideshow views of images
Collaboration Spaces
Customizable Permissions and Access control
Integrated WYSIWYG Word Processor
WYSIWYG creation and editing of HTML content tables
Content Ratings
Content Tagging support
People Directory
Working Copy support
Link and reference integrity maintenance
Automatic locking and unlocking
Complete revision history of all content and files
Workflow capabilities
Integrated Full Text indexing of (Word, Excel, PowerPoint, PDF, HTML, Text and other file formats)
Rules engine for content
Auto-generated tables of contents
Multi-file uploads
Live Search
Faceted Search
i18n support
Accessibility compliant
Time-based publishing and expiry of content
Standards-compliant XHTML and CSS
RSS syndication of content and files
Automatic image scaling and thumbnail generation
Cross-platform
Comment capabilities on any content
WebDAV support
Backup support
Cut/copy/paste operations on content
Email notifications
Desktop Client 
Automatic Backlinking
Granular rights based content editing and user-to-user collaboration
Access rights based AJAX user interface
Co - author rich content, files and documents
Selectively move content from private to public spaces
Sensible, easy-to-remember URLs
Server based image resizing for preview and download

Applications
Designed to be used generically, the cyn.in bliki service can be applied in the following business applications:
Knowledge management
Document management
Enterprise content management
Digital asset management
Online file system
Version control system
Group Collaboration

Pricing model
The cyn.in service is made available for purchase by businesses in the Software-as-a-Service (SaaS) model at a flexible per user cost. cyn.in is a multi-tenant system; each customer of cyn.in may purchase one or more cyn.in sites each of which are located at a user selectable subdomain of the main cyn.in service. Each site allows a set of users to log into it to access internal functionality; the service offers a central user authentication system and thus allows the same users to be members of different cyn.in sites as well.

A free version is also available for individual professionals with some limitations in storage and the maximum number of users that are allowed.

Awards

 2009
 Les Tropées du Libre (nominee)
 SourceForge Community Choice Awards - Finalist in 3 categories  - Best New Project, Best Commercial Open Source Project & Best Visual Design

See also

 Enterprise social software
 List of collaborative software
 List of content management systems

References

External links
 
 Official Cyn.in Software Buy / Purchase Link
 Cynapse Blog
 User and Administration Wiki Documentation
 Cyn.in listed as an add-on product on the Plone Website
 Cyn.in Desktop client listing in the Flex showcase

Blog hosting services
Free content management systems
Free wiki software
Cross-platform software
Free business software
Free groupware
Groupware
Zope
Python (programming language) software
Adobe Integrated Runtime platform software
2006 software